The International Union for Prehistoric and Protohistoric Sciences (IUPPS)  is a learned society, linked through the International Council for Philosophy and Humanistic Studies to UNESCO, and concerned with the study of prehistory and protohistory. In the words of its constitution:

The UISPP is committed to promote prehistoric and protohistoric studies by the organisation of international congresses and of large-scale excavations of international significance; by sponsoring scholarly publications of international scope as well as conferences and other learned meetings; and in general by advancing research by the co-operation and mutual understanding among scholars from all countries.

Origins 

The origins of the IUPPS lie in an 1865 meeting of the Società Italiana di Scienze Naturali that led to the creation of the Congrès paléoethnologique international (CPI). The first meeting of the CPI was held in Neuchâtel in 1866. The following year, in Paris, the name was changed to Congrès international d'anthropologie et d'archéologie préhistoriques (CIAAP; International Congress of Prehistoric Anthropology and Archaeology).

A permanent council of the CIAAP was founded in 1880, and in 1930 a merger with the Institut International d'Anthropologie led to the creation of the Congrès international des Sciences préhistoriques et protohistoriques (CISPP). In 1954, the permanent council decided to affiliate the CISPP with a member organisation of UNESCO, the International Council for Philosophy and Human Sciences. This required a change of name, and the CISPP became the International Union for Prehistoric and Protohistoric Sciences (IUPPS) in order to gain access to UNESCO funds.

UISPP became a member of the Unesco associate International Council of Philosophy and Human Sciences, since September 29th, 1955. As an international association of scholars, its aim is the collaboration of scholars from all countries through initiatives that may contribute for the advancement of prehistoric and protohistoric sciences, based on full academic freedom and refusing any sort of discrimination based on race, philosophical or ideological judgement, ethnic or geographic affiliation, nationality, sex, language or other, since discrimination is, by definition, the negation of the scientific approach. It also rejects any attempts of fictional rewriting of the past or of negationism, and it doesn’t exclude any bona fide scholar from its scientific activities.

Executive committee 

The executive committee of UISPP serves the purpose of maintaining the traditions of the UISPP and follows the development of the activities within the UISPP. It works in collaboration with the bureau, when asked, to represent the UISPP and to follow up the activities of the scientific commissions.
The executive committee follows up the progress of the organization of the world congress, does only intervene in the organization of it when unexpected events appear or when important delays in the program proposed by the organizing institution are noted.
It is composed by the Board (President, Secretary-General, Treasurer, Vice-President, Deputy Secretary-General) and the Presidents of all International Scientific Commissions of UISPP.

Scientific Commissions 

The general assembly decides of the creation of scientific commissions, after advice of the executive committee. Their objective is to promote and coordinate internationally research in a specific or specialized domain of the prehistoric and protohistoric sciences between each world congress. The commissions are grouped into six larger domains. This list is not limited.
- Historiography, methods and theories (history of archaeology, theories and methods in archaeology, various methods used in the archaeology and related to sciences, natural sciences, applied sciences, biological sciences, social sciences, economic sciences, etc.),
- Culture, economy and environments (specific periods, diachronic themes, regional peculiarities),
- Cultures and economy,
- Archaeology of specific environments (deserts, mountains, volcanic areas, coastal areas, islands, etc.),
- Art and culture (all forms of artistic expression during prehistory and protohistory, including parietal art and mobile art),
- Archaeology and societies (interaction between archaeology and current society, including strategies for heritage management or for scientific research, and questions of the public). 

The principal activities of a scientific commission are:
The setting up of an annual meeting of the commission, to elaborate an activity program for the next year and accept the report of the previous meeting,
The dispersion of an electronic newsletter, at least once a year, for the members of the commission, with copy to the secretary general and with a list of all the members of the commission, as well as their corresponding email and postal address,
The organization of scientific activities (colloquia, conferences, sessions, thematic schools) during each UISPP world congress and at least once in between; these activities are published.

Congresses of the CISPP and IUPPS 

 First congress: 1932, London
 Second congress: 1936, Oslo
 Third congress: 1950, Zürich
 Fourth congress: 1954, Madrid
 Fifth congress: 1958, Hamburg
 Sixth congress: 1962, Rome
 Seventh congress: 1966, Prague
 Eighth congress: 1971, Belgrade
 Ninth congress: 1976, Nice
 Tenth congress: 1981, Mexico City
 Eleventh congress: 1987, Mainz
 Twelfth congress: 1991, Bratislava
 Thirteenth congress: 1996, Forlì
 Fourteenth congress: 2001, Liège
 Fifteenth congress: 2006, Lisbon
 Sixteenth congress: 2011, Florianópolis
 Seventeenth congress: 2014, Burgos

The Eleventh congress should have been held in 1986 at Southampton, but the decision of the British organising committee, led by Peter Ucko, to exclude South African and Namibian delegates, despite they were opposed to apartheid, led to the foundation of the World Archaeological Congress and the delay of the IUPPS congress until 1987. Whereas the majority of UISPP members rejected the split as a divide of researchers and an opportunist move, writing in 1987, Peter Ucko still described the IUPPS as,

a dinosaur which continues to seek to manipulate the world situation according to its archaic Western European preconceptions about what is relevant and important and what is not. It does so by devices such as the imposition of white rules and regulations which no one bothers to explain and by the manipulation of bureaucratic procedures.

UISPP lamented this approach and kept its activity. Since 2005 relations between UISPP and WAC were resumed. Despite initial divides, UISPP remained focused in prehistoric and protohistoric research, while WAC evolved primarily into political committed approaches, the two organisations having therefore different scopes.

The XVIII world Congress of UISPP will be held in Paris, June 2018. It will have as a major topic "Adaptation and sustainability of prehistoric and protohistoric societies confronted to climate change". This major congress will be articulated with the current refoundation of Humanities that is being led by the International Council for the Philosophy and Human Sciences (that includes UISPP) and UNESCO. As for each worldwide UISPP congress, the congress is opened to any other sessions, independently of the above general theme, which could be proposed during the general call for sessions.

References
 Ucko, P.J., Academic Freedom and Apartheid, London: Duckworth, 1987. 
 www.uispp.org

External links
 International Union for Prehistoric and Protohistoric Sciences official portal

Archaeological organizations
International learned societies